Linsleychroma monnei is a species of beetle in the family Cerambycidae; the only species in the genus Linsleychroma.

References

Callichromatini